Argyrotaenia dorsalana is a moth of the family Tortricidae. It is found in North America from British Columbia and Washington, south to California and Utah.

The wingspan is 16–22 mm.

The larvae mainly feed on Douglas-fir, Rocky Mountain Douglas-fir, western hemlock and western larch, but have also been recorded on grand fir, ponderosa pine and spruce. It appears to overwinter in the egg stage. Larvae are present from early May to mid-June. Pupation takes place in late June and adults emerge soon after.

References

External links
 Bug Guide
  Species info
  Images

Moths described in 1903
dorsalana
Moths of North America